Steuerberater (StB) is the professional license for tax advisors in Germany.

The provision of tax advisory services is restricted and basically permissible for Steuerberater, Rechtsanwälte (attorneys-at-law) and Wirtschaftsprüfer (certified public accountants) only according to German law. In order to obtain this qualification, an individual must pass the Steuerberaterprüfung, a special uniform nationwide state examination. Merely being qualified as an attorney at law is not sufficient. Individuals may hold several of the aforementioned qualifications at the same time, e.g. be dual qualified and licensed as Rechtsanwalt (attorney-at-law) and Steuerberater (licensed tax advisor) at the same time. 

A similar license exists in Austria, Poland and Switzerland.

Examination ("the Steuerberaterprüfung") 

The Steuerberaterprüfung is a uniform nationwide state examination, the passing of which is normally the necessary condition for the appointment as German certified tax advisor (Steuerberater).

The exam includes a written part (with three exams of 6 hours each) and an oral examination. The written part of the Steuerberaterprüfung is held once every year in the beginning of the month of October.

General remarks 

The Steuerberaterprüfung is considered one of the toughest and prestigious professional examinations in Germany, often compared with full university law studies, with the difference that examinees prepare for the Steuerberaterprüfung alongside their regular occupation (e.g. in the evenings or on weekends). Registration for the Steuerberaterprüfung is possible only if candidates already have considerable professional experience and technical knowledge (2 – 10 years, depending on educational background—see below).

The preparation time is usually long (2 – 3 years), whereby a full release from professional duties for approx. 4 – 5 months preceding the date of examination is common practice in many tax advisory firms. During this preparation time, most examinees attend professional courses, tutorials and/or mock exam events to gear up for the real examinations. Notably, certain providers even offer dedicated training camps in preparation for the Steuerberaterprüfung.

Yet, despite the high qualification of exams and the considerable technical and financial effort made by most candidates, the Steuerberaterprüfung is distinguished by a very low passing rate: Based on the long term average, the pass rate usually is at about 40% only with reference to all candidates registered for the exams and still at about 50% only with reference to those candidates who registered for the exams, appeared on the date of exams and effectively submitted their solutions to the exam board for review.

Given the low passing rate, a considerable number of examinees is typically resit candidates. Notably, the permitted number of resits in case of failure is limited to 2 only.

The low passing rates are often criticized, however, the fiscal authorities and the Chamber of Tax Advisers defend their practice with high quality standards.

Subjects 
Subjects of the Steuerberaterprüfung are according to § 37 para 3 StBerG.:

 Tax Procedural Law (including criminal law for tax offences);
 Taxes on income and capital, notably individual income tax, corporation tax, business tax ("Gewerbesteuer");
 Fiscal valuation law, inheritance tax and property tax;
 VAT, registration duties, fundamentals of customs legislation;
 Commercial law as well as fundamentals of civil law, company law, the bankruptcy law and the law of the European Union;
 General Management and Business Administration;
 Bookkeeping and Accounting;
 Economics;
 Professional law.

Conditions to sit in 
Conditions to sit in on the Steuerberaterprüfung are:

 A regular university or university of applied sciences education in business management, economics or jurisprudence finished with a relevant degree;
 followed by practical work in the field of taxes administered by German Federal Republic or the German state authorities.

The practical engagement must have been pursued over a period of at least 3 years when the normal period of university education is less than four years, otherwise for a period of at least 2 years.

Alternatively, admission to the Steuerberaterprüfung may be possible

 with a successfully completed apprenticeship with a member of the tax consulting of comparable profession followed by 10 years of practical work in the field of taxes administered by German Federal Republic or the German state authorities. Additional degrees such as Steuerfachwirt or Bilanzbuchhalter decrease the required practical work to 7 years.
 for higher civil services employees with at least 7 years practical work in the field of taxes administered by German Federal Republic or the German state authorities.

Exam process 
The written part of the Steuerberaterprüfung consists of 3 exams on 3 consecutive days (Tuesday to Thursday) with a length of 6 hours each. By passing with an overall average grade of 4.5 or better - where 1 is the highest and 6 the lowest mark - the examinee is accredited to the oral exam usually taking place in the first months of the following year. With a combined overall average grade of 4.15 or better the exam is passed.

Some years ago, each federal state ("Bundesland") had its own exam with some of them unofficially offering easier versions. This has been revised in that the exams are all to be taken on the same dates with the same content.

Practice 
Besides business advisory and accounting the main function for a Steuerberater is the tax advisory (esp. tax planning, tax compliance and tax litigation in German fiscal courts). The latter is a restricted work which only few professionals may perform (Vorbehaltsaufgabe).

Since the day of establishment Steuerberater is renowned as very well reputed license, not least because of the strict professional duties (Berufspflichten) which discriminate the Steuerberater from common business advisors. According to these strict professional duties, Steuerberater are inter alia restricted from performing any commercial activity ("gewerbliche Tätigkeit") while practicing as a licensed tax advisor.

Professional organisation and regulations 
Steuerberater may only work self-employed, in an association with other Steuerberatern or certain other professionals (e.g. attorneys-at-law) or as employees of the aforementioned. The only exception is the Syndikus-Steuerberater who is employed in a regular company but must be allowed to decide and work according to the law and his professional duties and independent of the employer's orders in this respect.

The licensing and supervisory authority is the Federal Chamber of Tax Advisors (Bundessteuerberaterkammer). The professional regulations applicable to Steuerberater are the Act on Tax Advisors (Steuerberatungsgesetz [StBerG]), the related Act on Tax Advisors Ordinance (Durchführungsverordnung zum Steuerberatungsgesetz [StBDV]), Tax Advisors' Code of Conduct (Berufsordnung [BOStB) and the Tax Advisers' Fees Regulation (Steuerberatervergütungsverordnung [StBVV]).

Notes 

Advisors
Tax occupations
Legal professions
Accounting qualifications